The Miss Minnesota Teen USA competition is the pageant that selects the representative for the state of Minnesota in the Miss Teen USA pageant. This pageant is directed by Future Productions based in Savage, Minnesota.

Minnesota has not been very successful at Miss Teen USA, with their first placement coming in 1995, in the pageant's thirteenth year. Minnesota teens have performed best in the 2000s, with two top fifteen, three top ten placements and a 4th runner-up placement.

Five Minnesota teens have won the Miss Minnesota USA pageant and competed at Miss USA.

The current titleholder is Ava Ernst of St. Paul, was crowned on May 29, 2022 at Ames Center in Burnsville. She will represent Minnesota for the title of Miss Teen USA 2022.

Results summary

Placements
4th runners-up: Maggie McGill (2013)
Top 10: Alla Ilushka (2002), Allison Arling (2004), Vanessa Vonbehren (2007)
Top 12: Michelle Borg (1995)
Top 15: Lauren Hindi (2005), Hannah Corbett (2011)
Minnesota holds a record of 7 placements at Miss Teen USA.

Awards
 Miss Congeniality: Olivia Herbert (2019)

Winners 

1 Age at the time of the Miss Teen USA pageant

References

External links
Official website

Minnesota
Women in Minnesota